Jean Gaudin may refer to:

 Jean-Claude Gaudin (born 1939), French politician
 Jean François Aimé Théophile Philippe Gaudin (1766–1833), Swiss pastor, professor and botanist
 Jean Gaudin (glass artist) (1879–1954), French painter, glass and mosaic artist

See also
 Gaudin